Tsogttsetsii (mighty father) is a sum (district) of Ömnögovi Province in southern Mongolia. The Tavan Tolgoi coal mine is 15 km southwest of the sum center. In 2009, its population was 2,642.

References 

Districts of Ömnögovi Province